Crustoderma corneum is a species of fungus belonging to the family Meruliaceae.

It is native to Europe, Russian Far East and Northern America.

References

Meruliaceae